The Peter Stauer House is a historic building located in McGregor, Iowa, United States.  Completed in 1882, it is a two-story brick structure that features stone details, an attached frame wing on the back, a cross gable roof, and a wooden porch. Local architect Elias White Hale Jacobs designed the house in the Queen Anne style. Two prominent McGregor businessmen, Peter Stauer and J. A. Ramage, owned it consecutively.  The house was listed on the National Register of Historic Places in 2003.

References

Houses completed in 1882
McGregor, Iowa
Houses in Clayton County, Iowa
Houses on the National Register of Historic Places in Iowa
National Register of Historic Places in Clayton County, Iowa
Queen Anne architecture in Iowa